Juan Miguel Alonso Vázquez (born February 19, 1962 in San Sebastián, Spain) is a retired basketball player.

Clubs
1985-86/1989-92: CB Breogán

References
 ACB profile
 BREOGAN records

1962 births
Living people
CB Breogán players
Liga ACB players
Sportspeople from San Sebastián
Point guards
Spanish men's basketball players
Basketball players from the Basque Country (autonomous community)